Cora Divh, also called Coradeeve or Little Bassas de Pedro Bank (cf. Great Bassas de Pedro), is a submerged bank or sunken atoll belonging to the Amindivi Subgroup of islands of the Union Territory of Lakshadweep, India.

History
An Indian patrol ship is named after this bank.

Geography
It is also the northernmost feature, reaching to 13°58'N. Those coral banks, all submerged, form the north of Lakshadweep. Adas Bank, which lies 90 km to the north of Cora Divh, is the same type of formation but is not part of Lakshadweep.

Cora Divh is 42 km long southwest–northeast, and 12 about km wide. Its southwest point is located 34 km NNE of Sesostris Bank.
There are no emergent cays or islands. Cora Divh has depths of 27.4 to 55 m, and is covered by sand, coral rubble and broken shells. According to other sources, the least depth is 16 meters. Depths in the neighborhood of the bank reach 700 meters.

Administration
The bank belongs to the Ward of Chetlat Island of Aminidivi Tehsil.

References

External links

Prostar Sailing Directions 2005 India & Bay of Bengal
Geographical information

Undersea banks of Lakshadweep
Reefs of India
Reefs of the Indian Ocean
Underwater diving sites in India